Cayo Sur (meaning South Cay) is a small uninhabited island less than two hectares in size located in the Caribbean sea. The surrounding area has an abundance of fish and oil.

Dispute and resolution
The island  had been disputed by Honduras and Nicaragua since 2000. 
In 2000 Nicaragua accused Honduras of putting troops on the tiny island, and one Honduran diplomat was quoted as saying the country has "cuatro gatos" (four cats) on the island. The presence of troops was later confirmed by Honduran Foreign Minister Roberto Flores. Military attachés taken to the island by Honduras claimed there were no troops on the island. In 2001, the two countries signed an agreement to ease the conflict in the presence of an Organization of American States ambassador; the case went before the International Court of Justice, which unanimously granted Honduras sovereignty over Cayo Sur and three other cays on 8 October 2007.

References

Sources
news
TED tlk info
study
data

Uninhabited islands of Honduras
Territorial disputes of Honduras
Territorial disputes of Nicaragua